Al Wakrah is the capital city of the Al Wakrah Municipality in Qatar. Al Wakrah's eastern edge is the shores of the Persian Gulf and Qatar's capital Doha is situated to the city's immediate north. Governed by Sheikh Abdulrahman bin Jassim Al Thani, it was originally a small fishing and pearling village. Over the years, it evolved into a small city with a population of more than 80,000 and is currently considered to be the second-largest city in Qatar.

It has undergone extensive development and growth since the turn of the 21st century while also being steadily encroached on by rapidly expanding Doha from the north. Notable milestones in the city's modern history include the May 2019 inauguration of Al Janoub Stadium, a venue for the Qatar 2022 World Cup, the opening of Al Wakrah Heritage Village in 2016, the Al Wakrah Main Road Project which was set to be completed in 2020, and the city's integration into the Doha Metro's Red Line.

Etymology
The city's name derives the Arabic word "wakar", which roughly translates to "bird's nest". According to the Ministry of Municipality and Environment, this name was given in reference to a nearby hill (likely Jebel Al Wakrah) which accommodated the nests of several birds.

History

Pre-independence of Qatar
Due to a wealth of archaeological evidence, it has been claimed that Al Wakrah served as the first urban centre of Qatar. The city was historically used as a pearling center during the period in which Qatar's economy was almost entirely dependent on the bustling pearling industry. According to the United States Hydrographic Office, by 1920, there were approximately 300 ships situated in the town. A following study carried out by the British in 1925 stated that there were 250 boats in Wakrah's port. Al Wakrah was thought to encompass the so-called 'Pirate Coast', as stated by a report written in 1898.

Al Khalifa rule (1783–1868)
According to records contained in the British India Library Office, a written account dating to 1845 states that the town accommodated 250 houses and had a population of roughly 1,000. It was said to be located 10 miles away from one of Qatar's then-primary pearling villages, Al Bidda. The records also stated that the town's original inhabitants were migrants from Al Bidda. Al Wakrah was described as "independent of Bidda and other towns; and as thriving and more cheerful in appearance than Bidda, to which it was equal in size".

In 1863, the Bahraini ruler Mohammed bin Khalifa sent his cousin Mohammed bin Ahmed to act as deputy emir of Qatar. He was soon compelled by the Qataris to return to Bahrain after arresting and deporting the ruler of Al Wakrah. In 1867, Bahrain launched a war against Qatar after the Naim tribe defeated the Bahraini army situated in the Peninsula. They succeeded in gaining support from Abu Dhabi, as Doha and Al Wakrah have long been harbors of refuge for Omani seceders. As a result, Al Wakrah was sacked by the combined Bahraini and Abu Dhabi forces. A British record later stated "that the towns of Doha and Wakrah were, at the end of 1867 temporarily blotted out of existence, the houses being dismantled and the inhabitants deported".

Abu Al-Qassim Munshi, a British resident in Qatar, wrote a memo regarding the districts of Qatar in 1872. In it, he mentions that "in the year 1218 [1803 in the Gregorian calendar], Al Wakrah was ruled by the Al-Boo-Aynain tribe", although J.G. Lorimer claims that the Al Buainain tribe migrated to Al Wakrah from Ar Ru'ays and Fuwayrit some time after 1828.

Ottoman rule (1871–1916)

Almost immediately after Qatar succumbed to Ottoman control, Major Ömer Bey compiled a report on the major towns in the peninsula. The article, published in January 1872, reflected on the depopulation of Al Wakrah resulting from the war by estimating a meager population of 400, while approximating the town's fleet at 50 ships. A British survey conducted on the area in 1890 asserted that the town, still suffering from the effects of the 1867 war, had since been rebuilt. The surveyors wrote that the Al Wakrah had 12 forts, at least 1,000 inhabitants, and several boats. Jebel Al Wakrah, an 85-feet high rocky hill, was noted 1 mile south of the town.

In 1885, a group of 100 Al Wakra natives from the Al-Buainain and Al-Jehran tribes left the town and settled at Al Ghariyah due to a dispute with Sheikh Jassim bin Mohammed Al Thani. A coalition, led by Mohammed bin Abdul Wahab, was formed to resist Sheikh Jassim. A meeting was summoned between Sheikh Jassim and Mohammed bin Abdul Wahab and the discussion was mediated by an Ottoman commander of an Al Bidda-situated gun boat. The Ottoman commander's proposal that the coalition be left alone infuriated Sheikh Jassim. This incited tribesmen loyal to Sheikh Jassim to attack Al Ghariyah, but they were defeated, with the Bani Hajr tribe suffering a few casualties.

At the end of 1902, the Ottomans installed Ottoman administrative officials in Al Wakrah and Zubarah in an attempt to assert their authority. This was in addition to the already existing Ottoman administrative officials in Doha. An Ottoman, Yusuf Bey, was appointed as Mudir of Al Wakrah in the spring of 1903. Due to British discontent, Yusuf Bey's appointment was short lived, and he was later called to act as the assistant Kaymakam of Qatar and did not return to Al Wakrah. Sheikh Abdulrahman bin Jassim Al Thani was appointed as Mudir by the Ottomans in place of Yusuf Bey the same year. This elicited fresh protests by the British government, who refused the Ottoman's rights to appoint any administrative official in Qatar. In November 1904, the Ottomans abolished the post altogether upon further urging by the British.

From December 1907, there were a series of disputes between the governor, Sheikh Abdulrahman, and the Al-Buainain tribe. The Al-Buainain tribe had objected to paying the annual boat tax, and in reprisal, the sheikh fined the tribe 10,000 Qatari riyals and expelled 6 of the tribe's leaders. As retribution, one of the tribe leader's sons attempted to shoot Sheikh Abdulrahman. His attempt was foiled, and he was imprisoned; however he was later procured forgiveness and released in return for the payment of the tax. The Al Buainains later sent an envoy, Ahmed bin Khater, to the Ottomans in Basra to request that a military garrison be erected in Al Wakrah in order to help accost the sheikh of Qatar, Jassim bin Mohammed Al Thani. The envoy returned with two letters from the Ottomans addressed to Jassim bin Mohammed. A fortnight later, the Al-Buainain tribe appealed to a Mutasarrıf of Al-Hasa, Mahir Pasha. This reinvigorated tensions between the British and the Ottomans, owing to the British belief that this had provided latitude for the Ottomans to exercise more authority over the Qatar Peninsula.

British protectorate (1916–1971)

A British survey carried out in 1925 recounts Al Wakrah in exhaustive detail. Concerning the infrastructure and borders, it asserts that most houses in Al Wakrah were made of mud and stone, as no other building materials were available. The town originally formed a compact block, but in the preceding years a detached quarter known as Rumailah sprung up about 800 yards northward. There were 8,000 inhabitants at the time of the census, with 2,000 individuals belonging to the Al-Buainain tribe, 1,500 to the Al-Huwala tribe, 850 to the Al-Khulaifat tribe, 1,000 black Africans, and 2,000 black African slaves. Other ethnic groups and tribes comprised the remaining 650 inhabitants. The Al-Khulaifat and Al-Maadeed tribes were described as being the sole inhabitants of the Rumailah quarter. The report also described the inhabitants of Al Wakrah as primarily being pearl divers, sailors and fishermen. It further reported Al Wakrah as being a market place with 75 shops.

Post declaration of independence

After Qatar earned its independence in 1971, Sheikh Khalifa bin Hamad Al Thani assumed control of the newly-found state in February 1972. One of his main policies was the decentralization of Qatar's housing and major infrastructure projects. To promote growth outside of Doha, in 1972 he ordered the construction of a jetty and approach channel in Al Wakrah. An urban development plan was enacted in Al Wakrah in 2008. The most prominent features of this plan were the development of Al Wakra beach, a development of the city center and the expansion of the southern portion of the city. The plan's main purpose was to improve the infrastructure in order to accommodate more than 600,000 residents.

The plans of the new stadium which is set to be constructed for the 2022 FIFA World Cup have caused considerable internet interest after being released in mid November 2013 because of the beautiful shape and coloring.

Geography

Roughly  of mangroves are found just off Al Wakrah's coast.

In a 2010 survey of Al Wakrah's coastal waters conducted by the Qatar Statistics Authority, it was found that its average depth was a shallow  and its average pH was 7.95. Furthermore, the waters had a salinity of 49.14 psu, an average temperature of 22.78 °C and 6.6 mg/L of dissolved oxygen.

Climate
Similar to other cities in Qatar, Al Wakrah has a mild average temperature in January, February, March, November and December. The summer season is in April, May, June, July, August, September, October and November. Al Wakrah has dry periods in January, February, March, April, May, June, July and August. On average, the warmest month is July and the coolest month is January. The following table shows the records and averages of Al Wakrah's temperature.

Historic architecture

Historic architecture is abundant in Al Wakrah, particularly in its coastal areas, and it is captured in mosques, old homes and the harbour. One significant landmark is the Al Wakrah Fort, which dates back to the early 20th century. It was built above the ruins of an older fort that had belonged to the Sheikh Abdulrahman bin Jassim Al Thani. It has two round towers and was previously used as a police office.

Houses

The house of Sheikh Ghanim Bin Abdulrahman Al-Thani, located on the beach, is considered to be an important historic landmark. This building has two storeys and its windows were designed to represent ornamental shapes. It was refurbished in 2004 under the supervision of the Restoration Departments of Qatar Museums Authority (QMA).

Abdullah bin Saad House, formerly owned by Abdullah bin Saad Al Mutallaq, is located in a remote section on the south-east coast of the city and is considered to be a historic landmark. The house was constructed in the early 20th century; most likely around 1920. After the municipality assumed ownership of the house in 1984, it was renovated two years later and eventually re-opened as a museum.

Mosques

Previously, Al Wakrah's largest mosque was Al Ayouni Mosque, constructed around 1935. It was built near the coast because it was the most active and populated section of the city. After a new mosque was built closer to the main road, the mosque became defunct. It has a square shape, measures 16 m by 17 m, and lies 67 cm above ground elevation. A rare characteristic of the mosque is its single entrance on the east side; a majority of other mosques in Qatar constructed during this period had three entrances. The outdoor praying area is accessible from five pathways separated by narrow columns. Adjacent to this is the prayer hall, which can be accessed from three different entrances in the outdoor area.

Abu Manaratain Mosque, a relatively small mosque, was erected in 1940 near the shore. It may have previously had two minarets, as its name indicates. It measures 27 m by 8 m. In the past, there was another mosque that neighbored Abu Manaratain on the west, but it was later disassembled. There are five entrances to the mosque. The minaret is funnel-shaped and extends 9 metres high. There is no outdoor praying area; only an indoor prayer hall is present.

Built around 1940, the Al Subaiei Mosque, located near Al Wakrah Museum, has since been renovated, with older building materials being replaced by concrete blocks. It has been used contiguously since its construction. As a result of continuous additions and structural improvements, it now measures 22 m by 13 m. The minaret has a square base and extends 5.5 metres high.

Developments

Al Wakrah Development Project
In 2008, municipal officials released their master plan for the development of Al Wakrah. Future plans were to heavily reflect on the city's historic pearling tradition. Developments were said to include a continuous public waterfront, a water park, a golf course, a maritime museum, several hotels and a cultural center. The project, dubbed the Al Wakrah Development Project, featured the Al Wakrah New Downtown, which was divided into seven sections, including:

The Wakrah Gateway, an exclusive zone for large-scale government offices and public services.
South Square''', which will accommodate a range of office complexes, residential units and middle and lower level retail outlets.The Festival Bay, containing a minimum of two resort hotels, several business hotels, a maritime museum, a marina, and an arts and cultural center.Wakrah Sands will host the main family attractions, such as family parks, recreation precincts, and retail and cultural establishments.Wakrah Residence will mainly act as a housing area, being set to contain multi-purpose residential complexes.Wakrah College, a segment for Al Wakrah's educational institutions.Wakrah Trade Center'' is purposed for malls and retail complexes.

The Al Wakrah Development Project was part of the more extensive Qatar National Master Plan, which outlined several urban development goals for the future. The plan's goals for Al Wakrah were devised on the notion that the city's population would increase to 600,000 by 2030. Currently, it is unknown whether the Al Wakrah New Downtown project and the other smaller-scale projects are still underway or have been abandoned.

Al Wakrah Main Road Project
Ashghal (The Public Works Authority) embarked on a QR 600 million overhaul of the city's road system in late 2018. As part of the project, 9 km of road extending from G-Ring Road to Mesaieed Road will undergo development. This includes converting the main road from two lanes to three lanes, installing an additional four intersections, and converting roundabouts to controlled intersections. Furthermore, a tunnel which runs in both directions for 160 meters starting at Al Wakrah Metro Station is under construction. Pedestrians and cyclists will also receive an additional 6.1 km of exclusive paths. The project will be carried out in three distinct phases and is anticipated to be completed by 2020.

Visitor attractions

A large quota of public parks and entertainment projects has been allocated for Al Wakrah. One of the most significant projects was Al Wakrah Heritage Village. The village includes Al Wakrah Souq, Al Wakrah Corniche and a gated mosque stretching over 3 km of waterfront next to Al Wakrah Port. The village was first conceived of as part of the Al Wakrah Development Project, which was unveiled to the public in 2008. Six years after first being announced, the village officially opened in December 2014. There are more than a hundred shops in the souq selling traditional crafts as well as several restaurants.

The construction of the Wakrah Mall, the multi-storeyed mall located opposite to Al Wakra Hospital, was tentatively dated for completion by the end of 2015. It was launched by the Ezdan Group.

Public beaches
There are two main public beaches in the city, Al Wakrah Souq Beach and Al Wakrah Family Beach. They are located a few minutes apart from each other. Al Wakrah Souq Beach was opened to the public in mid-2017 as a family-oriented beach which also caters to certain water sports. Initially the beach was free of charge but this policy was revised to charge for specific activities. Also located on the beach is a large playground area, which was opened in 2018. The playground contains not only children's play equipment but also has facilities for playing football and volleyball.

Al Wakrah Family Beach is one of the most popular beaches in the country. The beach is flat and has very low waters. Among the facilities here are a children's playground, barbecue pits, parking lots, changing rooms and a few gazebos. There is also an area to play football and volleyball.

Souq Waqif Al Wakra 
Souq Al Wakra or Al Wakra Old Market, was opened in 2014, and it is the located directly on wakra beach in the State of Qatar. The market building is a mixture between the past and the present. This market was designed with a heritage features. The design method is considered to be the old traditional buildings styles, as the houses are divided into groups of rooms, currently most of it are as commercial shops. this market was designed to take the form of the old popular house in Qatar.

There are a group of restaurants that extend along the coast, and there are ships and boats with the old country style. 
Souq Al Wakra hotel is attached to the market and it is managed by Tivoli Hotels Group.

Healthcare

Al Wakrah Hospital, a facility of Hamad Medical Corporation, opened in December 2012. It is a general hospital that has 325 beds and is staffed by 217 doctors. With its associated buildings, it covers an area of more than 300,000 m2. The hospital provides modern medical and surgical facilities to Qatar's southern sector, which includes the cities of Al Wakrah and Mesaieed. The facilities contain surgical, obstetrics, gynecology, dentistry, dermatology and children's wards. A specialized diabetes center was created in December 2014.

Education
The city's first public library was opened in 1985. The Dar Abdulrahman Darwish Fakhroo Quran Learning Center for Women is found in the center of the city.

Schools in Al Wakrah include:

Sports
Al Wakrah has a multi-sports club called the Al-Wakrah Sports Club, whose football team competes in the top tier of Qatari football, the Qatar Stars League. The club's home ground is the Saoud bin Abdulrahman Stadium, a multi-purpose stadium. The stadium has a capacity of 20,000 seats.

The city will play a part in hosting the 2022 FIFA World Cup through Al Janoub Stadium, formerly known as Al Wakrah Stadium, which will have a capacity for 40,000 spectators. In addition to the stadium, a marketplace, a school, restaurants and parkland will all be located in a central plaza. Al Wakrah Sports Club will be handed control of the stadium to replace the Saoud bin Abdulrahman Stadium once the 2022 World Cup is over. The design of the stadium, conceived by Zaha Hadid, takes the form of the sails of a dhow.

Transportation

Karwa Transportation company (Mowasalat) has connected Al Wakrah to the rest of the cities in Qatar using its bus route. Currently, there are several buses operating there.

In 2015, the Public Works Authority declared their plan to construct a free-flowing road directly linking Al Wakrah to Doha in order to decrease traffic congestion in Doha. It is set for completion by 2018.

Transportation infrastructure in the city will be overhauled as part of the Al Wakrah Main Road Project launched by Ashghal in late 2018. It is estimated that work will be done by 2020.

Rail
The elevated Al Wakra station currently serves the Red Line of the Doha Metro. As part of the metro's Phase 1, the station was inaugurated on 8 May 2019, along with all other Red Line stations. It is located on Al Wakrah Road.

Among the station's facilities are a Masraf Al Rayyan ATM, a Qatar National Bank ATM, a prayer room, restrooms and a carpark. There are a total of five metrolinks, which is the Doha Metro's feeder bus network, servicing the station:

M127, which serves Souq Al Wakra.
M128, which serves Al Wakrah South.
M130, which serves Ezdan Village 4-7 (Al Wukair).
M131, which serves Ezdan Village 3 and 8–11 (Al Wukair).
M134, which serves Al Wakrah South and Al Wakrah Hospital

Administration
When free elections of the Central Municipal Council first took place in Qatar during 1999, Al Wakrah was designated the constituency seat of constituency no. 10. It would remain the headquarters of constituency no. 10 for the next three consecutive elections until the fifth municipal elections in 2015, when it was made the headquarters of constituency no. 20. Also included in its constituency is Mesaieed (as of the 2015 elections), Al Wukair, Ras Abu Fontas, Khawr al Udayd, Wadi Abu Saleel, Al Mashaf, and Al Naqiyan East. In the inaugural municipal elections in 1999, Ahmed Jassim Al-Muftah won the elections, receiving 57.2%, or 636 votes. Hassan Abbas Abdul Rahim was elected in the 2002 elections. He retained his seat successfully in the next two elections in 2007 and 2011. For the 2015 elections, Mansour Ahmad Yousif Al-Khater was elected municipal representative.

Demographics

As of the 2010 census, the city comprised 8,436 housing units and 796 establishments. There were 79,457 people living in the city, of which 75% were male and 25% were female. Out of the 79,457 inhabitants, 81% were 20 years of age or older and 19% were under the age of 20. The literacy rate stood at 98.4%.

Employed persons made up 73% of the total population. Females accounted for 12% of the working population, while males accounted for 88% of the working population.

International relations

Twin towns and sister cities
Al Wakrah is twinned with:
 Ramsar, Iran (2010)
 Djougou, Benin (2014)

References

External links
 

 
Cities in Qatar
Populated places in Al Wakrah
Populated coastal places in Qatar